The Colorado Mammoth are a lacrosse team based in Denver, Colorado playing in the National Lacrosse League (NLL). The 2007 season was the 21st in franchise history and 5th as the Mammoth (previously the Washington Power, Pittsburgh Crossefire, and Baltimore Thunder).

The Mammoth won the Western division title with a 12-4 record, but were eliminated in the first round by the 4th place San Jose Stealth. The 2007 season marked Gary Gait's last as Mammoth head coach; he resigned following the season to become head coach of the Syracuse University women's lacrosse team.

Regular season

Conference standings

Game log
Reference:

Playoffs

Game log
Reference:

Player stats
Reference:

Runners (Top 10)

Note: GP = Games played; G = Goals; A = Assists; Pts = Points; LB = Loose Balls; PIM = Penalty minutes

Goaltenders
Note: GP = Games played; MIN = Minutes; W = Wins; L = Losses; GA = Goals against; Sv% = Save percentage; GAA = Goals against average

Awards

Transactions

Trades

Roster
Reference:

See also
2007 NLL season

References

Colorado
2007 in sports in Colorado